is a Japanese footballer currently playing as a midfielder for Vanraure Hachinohe.

Career statistics

Club
.

Notes

References

External links

1997 births
Living people
Association football people from Saitama Prefecture
Tokyo Gakugei University alumni
Japanese footballers
Association football midfielders
J3 League players
Iwate Grulla Morioka players
Vanraure Hachinohe players